František Komňacký (born 15 November 1951) is a Czech football manager and former player.

Career
As a player, Komňacký played for regional clubs from South Moravia, his native region. In 1970, he went to Russia to study pedagogy and played four years until his graduation for Neftyanik Volgograd. After his return he played again for regional teams but in 1978 also began his managerial career, he then led the youth team of Jiskra Kyjov.

His first work as a head manager was at FK Drnovice in 1986–1988, he then coached Hanácká Slavia Kroměříž and Tatran Poštorná.

In 1997, he began work at 1. FC Synot and advanced with the team to the Gambrinus liga in 2000. He then led FK Zlín and MŠK Žilina. In the 2002–03 season Komňacký led Matador Púchov and won the Slovak Cup with them. For the next season he returned to the Czech Republic to work at Silesian club Baník Ostrava.

Baník led the league almost the whole 2003–04 season and won the Gambrinus liga for the first time in the history of the independent Czech Republic. Six years later Komňacký remembered that season: "I spent there a wonderful season, which I will not forget. I have that club and region in my heart."

Afterwards Komňacký went back to Slovakia and won both the Slovak Cup and the Corgoň Liga with MFK Ružomberok in the 2005–06 season. In October 2007 he started coaching FK Jablonec. In the 2009–10 season, Jablonec finished second in the Gambrinus liga for the first time in its history.

He received several awards for his achievements. In 2004, he was awarded the Rudolf Vytlačil Award for the Czech Coach of the Year, for leading Baník Ostrava to the national championship. In 2009, he was awarded the Czech Coach of the Year award for a progress he made with FK Jablonec. In 2010, he was again awarded the Rudolf Vytlačil Award for the Czech Coach of the Year, for leading FK Jablonec to the historic success of runner-up position in the 2009–10 season.

In January 2010 he signed a contract extension to keep him at Jablonec until the end of June 2011.

In the summer of 2012, Komňacký left Jablonec after nearly five years in charge, joining Gambrinus liga newcomers Vysočina Jihlava.

Honours

Managerial
1. FC Synot
 Czech Second League: 1999–00

Matador Púchov
 Slovak Cup: 2002–03

Baník Ostrava
 Gambrinus liga: 2003–04

MFK Ružomberok
 Slovak Superliga: 2005–06
 Slovak Cup: 2005–06

References

1951 births
Living people
People from Hodonín District
Sportspeople from the South Moravian Region
Czech footballers
Czechoslovak footballers
Association football midfielders
FK Drnovice players
Czech football managers
Czechoslovak football managers
Czech First League managers
Slovak Super Liga managers
1. FC Slovácko managers
FC Fastav Zlín managers
MŠK Žilina managers
FC Baník Ostrava managers
FC SKA Rostov-on-Don managers
FK Jablonec managers
FC Vysočina Jihlava managers
MFK Ružomberok managers
MŠK Púchov managers
Expatriate football managers in Russia
Expatriate football managers in Slovakia